Goic or Goić is a surname. Notable people with the surname include:

Alejandro Goic (actor) (born 1957), Chilean actor
Alejandro Goić (bishop) (born 1940), Chilean Roman Catholic bishop
Carolina Goic (born 1972), Chilean politician
Pedro Goić (1896–1995), Croatian athlete